Flainn is a surname. Notable people with the surname include:
Aenghus Ua Flainn
Ailill Corrach mac Flainn (died 741), king of the Uí Failge, a Laigin people of County Offaly
Cináed mac Flainn (died 770), king of the Uí Failge, a Laigin people of County Offaly
Conaing mac Flainn (died 849), King of Brega from the Uí Chonaing sept of Cnogba (Knowth) of the Síl nÁedo Sláine branch of the southern Ui Neill
Cummascach mac Flainn (died 757), king of the Uí Failge, a Laigin people of County Offaly
Donnchad Donn mac Flainn
Fithceallach mac Flainn
Flaithnia mac Flainn (died 755), king of the Uí Failge, a Laigin people of County Offaly
Flann Mac Flainn
Mugrón mac Flainn (died 782), king of the Uí Failge, a Laigin people of County Offaly
Nicol Mac Flainn
Ragnall Ua Flainn Chua
Tóim Snáma mac Flainn (died 770), King of Osraige in modern County Kilkenny
Ólchobar mac Flainn (died 796), supposed King of Munster from the Uí Fidgenti of County Limerick